Nicholas James Rogers (born 19 August 1985), commonly known as Nick Rogers, is a British Conservative Party politician. He is a member of the London Assembly representing South West London.

Early life and education 
Rogers was born in 1985, the son of Neil Rogers and Fiona Dunn. He received a degree in Management from Royal Holloway, University of London.

Career 
Since 2015, Rogers has been an incident controller at Network Rail. From 2016 to 2020, he was a director of TEDxKingstonUponThames.

He was elected as a Conservative to Tunbridge Wells Borough Council in 2011 and served as a councillor for the Culverden ward until 2015.

Personal life 
Rogers entered into a civil partnership in 2011 with his partner Liam. Outside politics, his interests are airships, jazz, architecture and history.

References 

Conservative Members of the London Assembly
1985 births
Living people
Date of birth missing (living people)